Couchepaganiche Ecological Reserve is an ecological reserve of Quebec, Canada. It was established on

References

External links
 Official website from Government of Québec

Nature reserves in Quebec
Protected areas established in 1983
Protected areas of Saguenay–Lac-Saint-Jean
1983 establishments in Quebec